Visa requirements for South Sudanese citizens are administrative entry restrictions by the authorities of other states placed on citizens of South Sudan. As of 2 July 2019, South Sudanese citizens had visa-free or visa on arrival access to 42 countries and territories, ranking the South Sudanese passport 99th in terms of travel freedom (tied with the passports of Congo (Dem. Rep.), Ethiopia and Sri Lanka) according to the Henley Passport Index.

Visa requirements map

Visa requirements

Dependent, Disputed, or Restricted territories
Unrecognized or partially recognized countries

Dependent and autonomous territories

See also

Visa policy of South Sudan
South Sudanese passport
Visa requirements for Burundian citizens
Visa requirements for Congo DR citizens
Visa requirements for Kenyan citizens
Visa requirements for Rwandan citizens
Visa requirements for Tanzanian citizens
Visa requirements for Ugandan citizens

References and Notes
References

Notes

South Sudan
Government of South Sudan